Bargi Dam is one of the first completed dams out of the chain of 30 major dams to be constructed on Narmada River in Madhya Pradesh, India. Two major irrigation projects, named Bargi Diversion Project and Rani Avantibai Lodhi Sagar Project, have been developed by the Bargi Dam administration.

References

External links 
 

Dams in Madhya Pradesh
Hydroelectric power stations in Madhya Pradesh
Tourist attractions in Jabalpur district
Narmada River
Dams on the Narmada River
Buildings and structures in Jabalpur
Dams completed in 1998
1998 establishments in Madhya Pradesh
20th-century architecture in India